The Governor of Chernivtsi Oblast is the head of executive branch for the Chernivtsi Oblast.

The office of Governor is an appointed position, with officeholders being appointed by the President of Ukraine, on recommendation from the Prime Minister of Ukraine, to serve a four-year term.

The official residence for the Governor is located in Chernivtsi. Since 22 November 2019 the Governor is Serhiy Osachuk.

Governors
 Ivan Hnatyshyn (1992-1994, as the Presidential representative)
 Ivan Hnatyshyn (1995-1996, as the Governor)
 Heorhiy Filipchuk (1996-1998)
 Teofil Bauer (1998-2003)
 Mykhailo Romaniv (2003-2005)
 Mykola Tkach (2005-2006)
 Volodymyr Kulish (2006-2010)
 Mykhailo Papiyev (2010-2014)
 Mykhailo Romaniv (2014) 
 Roman Vanzuryak (2014)
 Ivan Rybak (2014, acting)
 Roman Marchuk (2014-2015, acting)
 Oleksandr Fyshchuk (2015-2018)
 Mykhaylo Pavlyuk (2018-2019, acting)
 Serhiy Osachuk (2019-2022)
 Ruslan Zaparanyuk (2022-)

Notes

References

Sources
 World Statesmen.org

External links
Government of Chernivtsi Oblast  in Ukrainian

 
Chernivtsi Oblast